The PWBA Hall of Fame is a Hall of Fame established by the Professional Women's Bowling Association to honor individuals "who have dedicated their time and passion to the sport of bowling both on and off the lanes."

Inductees

1995
 Donna Adamek - performance
 LaVerne Carter - pioneer
 Patty Costello - performance
 Helen Duval - pioneer
 Dorothy Fothergill - performance
 Shirley Garms - pioneer
 Mildred Ignizio - performance
 Marion Ladewig - performance
 Betty Morris - performance
 Georgia Veatch - builder

1996
 Janet Buehler - builder
 Doris Coburn - pioneer
 John Falzone - builder
 Nikki Gianulias - performance
 Lorrie Nichols - performance
 Jeanette Robinson - pioneer
 Robin Romeo - performance
 Lisa Wagner - performance
 Donna Zimmerman - pioneer

1997
 Loa Boxberger - pioneer
 Cindy Coburn-Carroll - performance
 Pat Costello - performance
 Fran Deken - builder
 Vesma Grinfelds - performance
 Pearl Keller - builder
 John Sommer Jr. - builder
 Judy Soutar - pioneer

1998
 Joy Abel - pioneer 
 Tish Johnson - performance
 Bev Ortner - pioneer
 Aleta Sill - performance

2002
 Dana Miller-Mackie - performance
 Jeanne Naccarato - performance

2003
 Anne Marie Duggan - performance
 Virginia Norton - performance

2019
 Donna Conners - meritorious service/builder
 Leanne Hulsenberg - performance
 Wendy Macpherson - performance

2020
 Pam Buckner - performance
 Carolyn Dorin-Ballard - performance
 Carol Gianotti - performance

2022
 Kim Adler - performance
 Joan Romeo - meritorious service/builder
 Kim Terrell-Kearney - performance

References

Ten-pin bowling
Women's halls of fame